Group D was one of four groups of nations competing at the 2007 FIFA Women's World Cup. The group's first round of matches began on September 12 and its last matches were played on September 20. Most matches were played at the Wuhan Stadium in Wuhan. Emerging powers Brazil topped the group with a 100% record, joined in the second round by hosts China PR.

Standings

Matches
All times are local (UTC+8)

New Zealand vs Brazil

China PR vs Denmark

Denmark vs New Zealand

Brazil vs China PR

China PR vs New Zealand

Brazil vs Denmark

Notes

References 

Group
2007–08 in Danish women's football
2007 in Chinese football
Group
2007–08 in New Zealand association football